17 Corps, 17th Corps, Seventeenth Corps, or XVII Corps may refer to:

XVII Corps (German Empire), a unit of the Imperial German Army prior to and during World War I
XVII Reserve Corps (German Empire), a unit of the Imperial German Army during World War I
XVII Corps (India)
XVII Corps (Italy)
XVII Corps (Ottoman Empire)
XVII Corps (United Kingdom)
XVII Corps (Union Army)

See also
 List of military corps
 List of military corps by number
 List of military corps by name